The 2014–15 Missouri State Lady Bears basketball team represented Missouri State University during the 2014–15 NCAA Division I women's basketball season. The Lady Bears, led by second year head coach Kellie Harper, played their home games at JQH Arena and were members of the Missouri Valley Conference. They finished the season 18–15, 13–5 in MVC play to finish in third place. They advanced to the championship game of the Missouri Valley Tournament where they lost to Wichita State. They were invited to the Women's National Invitation Tournament where they lost to Tulsa in the first round.

Roster

Schedule

|-
! colspan="9" style="background:maroon; color:#fff;"| Exhibition

|-
! colspan="9" style="background:maroon; color:#fff;"| Regular season

|-
! colspan="9" style="background:maroon; color:#fff;"| Missouri Valley Women's Tournament

See also
2014–15 Missouri State Bears basketball team

References

Missouri State Lady Bears basketball seasons
Missouri State
Missouri State
2015 Women's National Invitation Tournament participants
2014 in sports in Missouri
2015 in sports in Missouri